Ryan O'Neal Sims (born May 4, 1980) is a former American Football defensive tackle. Sims' professional career began in 2002 with the Kansas City Chiefs, for whom he played through the end of the 2006 season. He has also been a member of the Tampa Bay Buccaneers and Seattle Seahawks.

Professional career

Kansas City Chiefs
Sims played college football for the University of North Carolina and was the sixth overall pick in first round of the 2002 NFL Draft. Sims was a college teammate of the Carolina Panthers defensive end Julius Peppers. He graduated from Dorman High School in Spartanburg, SC. Sims is a member of Phi Beta Sigma fraternity and was initiated into the Xi Gamma Chapter while at UNC-Chapel Hill during the Spring 2000 semester. 

During his tenure with Kansas City, Sims played in a total of 74 games and notched 54 tackles, 5 sacks, and 1 interception. 

In 2006, Herm Edwards took over as coach of the Chiefs, and Sims saw his playing time reduced. He is remembered as one of the Chiefs Worst Draft Busts of all time.

Tampa Bay Buccaneers
He was traded to the Tampa Bay Buccaneers on May 1, 2007 for an undisclosed future draft pick (which would become a 2009 NFL Draft 7th round pick). On February 19, 2009, Sims signed a four-year/$8 million contract with the Buccaneers. On November 23, 2010, the Buccaneers released Sims. For the season, Sims totaled four tackles with no sacks in six games for Tampa Bay.

Seattle Seahawks
Sims signed with the Seattle Seahawks on July 31, 2011, but was released on August 20.

NFL season

References

External links
Tampa Bay Buccaneers bio
SI.com Draft Profile
Ryan Sims stats
Bucs release DT Sims
 

1980 births
Living people
Sportspeople from Spartanburg, South Carolina
Players of American football from South Carolina
American football defensive tackles
Tampa Bay Buccaneers players
Kansas City Chiefs players
North Carolina Tar Heels football players
Seattle Seahawks players